Romualdo Moro (9 August 1929, in Montevideo, Uruguay – 19 June 2001, in Santiago, Chile) was a former football forward. He played for most of his career in Universidad Católica and S.S.C. Napoli. He was part of the 1954 Universidad Católica team that won the Primera División de Chile.

Titles

References

2001 deaths
Uruguayan footballers
Uruguayan expatriate footballers
Uruguay international footballers
Club Deportivo Universidad Católica footballers
Chilean Primera División players
Expatriate footballers in Chile
1929 births
Association football forwards